Doombound is the sixth album by the Finnish symphonic metal band Battlelore, released on January 26, 2011. It was their final album before their hiatus. A digipak version including the CD, a bonus DVD, and a poster is available at Napalm Records website, which also released a sample for the song "Kärmessurma".

According to the band's blog:

Track listing 
All music and lyrics by Battlelore.

10 Years of Battlelore - bonus DVD 
Live at Club Nosturi, Helsinki, Finland June 27, 2008
Live at Club Nosturi, Helsinki, Finland January 1, 2009
"Evernight over Europe" Tour 2007
"The Last Alliance" Tour in Finland 2008
Photo galleries
Music videos:
"Third Immortal"
"House of Heroes"
"Storm of the Blade"
"Journey to Undying Lands"

Credits 
Band members
Kaisa Jouhki – vocals
Tomi Mykkänen – vocals
Jussi Rautio – guitar
Jyri Vahvanen – guitar
Timo Honkanen – bass
Henri Vahvanen – drums
Maria Honkanen – keyboards, flute

Additional musicians
Markus Vuoristo - cello on "Doombound" and "Kielo"
Dan Swanö - guitar solo on "Last of the Lords"
Janne Saksa - backing vocals

Production
Janne Saksa - producer, engineer
Dan Swanö - mixing, mastering

Release history 
The specific release dates follow: 
January 26, 2011 – ESP/FIN/SWE
January 28, 2011 – GAS/BENELUX/ITA
January 31, 2011 – Rest of Europe
February 8, 2011 – USA/CAN

References

External links 
 Battlelore Official Homepage

Battlelore albums
Napalm Records albums
2011 albums
Concept albums